Kliatt (stylized as KLIATT) was a bimonthly magazine that published reviews of young adult literature. It also published reviews of related media, such as educational software, that was designed for teachers and librarians interested in promoting reading among young adults. Each issue contained a featured article. The magazine was established in 1967 and published its final issue in November 2008. In 2004, it had a circulation of 2,300.

References

External links

1967 establishments in Massachusetts
2008 disestablishments in Massachusetts
Bimonthly magazines published in the United States
Book review magazines
Defunct literary magazines published in the United States
Magazines established in 1967
Magazines disestablished in 2008
Magazines published in Massachusetts
Young adult literature